Damien Dernoncourt is the Founder and CEO of Naga Brands, an operating platform bringing financing and functional expertise to brands, creative entrepreneurs and designers. In 2017, Naga Brands raised capital from family offices and its first investments were in accessories, jewelry and cosmetic.

Prior to Naga, Dernoncourt ran John Hardy for 11 years. He led an international team of 1,500 individuals across the company’s facilities in Asia and the US. Through a management buyout, Dernoncourt assumed control of the company with the support of private equity group 3i. In 2014, he sold a controlling stake to private equity group L Catterton and became non-executive chairman.

Dernoncourt began his career in Hong Kong, leading a buying office for a major French importer before starting, at 25, his own merchandising and packaging company in China.  A venture he later sold to complete an MBA at INSEAD. 

Dernoncourt regularly takes part in ultra-trail races, through which he raised money to finance the “Job for Life Foundation”, a charity he co-founded to give orphans in Bali the opportunity to learn a trade and live an independent life.

Born in France, Dernoncourt has been living in Hong Kong for the past 24 years, he has 2 children.

References 

1971 births
Living people
French businesspeople